Reelsville is an unincorporated community in central Washington Township, Putnam County, in the U.S. state of Indiana.  It lies along local roads just north of U.S. Route 40, southwest of the city of Greencastle, the county seat of Putnam County.  Its elevation is 676 feet (206 m), and it is located at  (39.5575439, -86.9669567).  Although Reelsville is unincorporated, it has a post office, with the ZIP code of 46171.

History
Reelsville was laid out in 1852 by John Reel, and named for him. A post office has been in operation at Reelsville since 1852.

References

Unincorporated communities in Putnam County, Indiana
Unincorporated communities in Indiana